The 1993 Western Kentucky Hilltoppers football team represented Western Kentucky University as an independent during the 1993 NCAA Division I-AA football season. Led by fifth-year head Jack Harbaugh, the Hilltoppers compiled a record of 8–3. They missed the NCAA Division I-AA Football Championship playoffs but finished the season ranked No. 19 in final NCAA Division I-AA poll.

Western Kentucky primarily ran an option offense and led NCAA Division I-AA team in rushing. The team's captains were Ben Mooney and Eddie Thompson. The roster included future National Football League (NFL) player Robert Jackson.

Schedule

References

Western Kentucky
Western Kentucky Hilltoppers football seasons
Western Kentucky Hilltoppers football